Gintonin is a glycolipoprotein fraction isolated from ginseng. The non-saponin ingredient was designated as gintonin, where gin was derived from ginseng, ton from the tonic effects of ginseng, and in from protein. The main component of gintonin is a complex of lysophosphatidic acids (LPA) and ginseng proteins such as ginseng major latex-like protein151 (GLP151) and ginseng ribonuclease-like storage protein.

GLP151 is a first plant-derived LPA binding protein as one of Bet v 1 superfamily. GLP151 has a LPA binding domain on H147 and H148 at C-terminal. These two histidine residues bind to phosphate group of LPA and deliver LPA to its cognate receptors to elicit cellular effects such as [Ca2+]i transient and morphological changes.

Lysophospholipid receptors are the high affinity and selective target receptor of gintonin. Gintonin induces [Ca2+]i transient in animal cells. Gintonin also shows in vivo anti-Alzheimer's disease effects through LPA receptor-mediated non-amyloidogenic pathways and enhances cognitive functions in elderly human Alzheimer's disease patients and boosting of hippocampal cholinergic system, hippocampal neurogenesis, anti-depression and in vivo anti-metastatic and anti-atopic dermatitis effects by inhibition of autotaxin activity.

See also
 Ginseng
 Ginsenoside
 Lysophosphatidic acid
 Lysophospholipid receptor

References

Further reading
 
 
 
 
 
 
 
 
 
 
 
 
 
 
 
 
 
 
 
 
 
 
 
 
 
 
 
 
 
 
 
 
 
 
 
 
 
 
 
 
 
 
 
 
 
 

Glycolipids